Selaʾ is a mountain in Medina in modern Saudi Arabia.

Mount Selaʾ in the "District of the Seven Mosques" in city of Medina Municipality in Saudi Arabia. Sela means "sliced", because the mountain looks as if it is sliced several times.

The Islamic prophet Muhammad in the Battle of the Trench prayed to God for victory on Mount Sela. Mount Sela was mentioned in several Hadith of the stories of Muhammad such as The Prayer for Rain, The forgiveness of Kaʾb bin Mālik.

Sela is mentioned by al-Ḥamdāni in his book Geography of Arabian Peninsula as part of Medina city in his time 150 years after Muhammad. His name and the name of his companions Umar and Ali are inscribed on a stone on top of the mountain.

References

External links
Photo of Mount Selae by Medina Municipality.
photo, the sliced Mountain

Mountains of Saudi Arabia